Sarteano is a comune (municipality) in the Province of Siena in the Italian region Tuscany, located about  southeast of Florence and about  southeast of Siena.

Sarteano is particularly important from the historical point of view. Located between Val d'Orcia and Valdichiana, the area of Sarteano has been inhabited for thousands of years. For this reason, Sarteano has a very rich archeology. In particular, some of the most important Etruscan tombs of Tuscany are located in the countryside around Sarteano. A large portion of the archeological objects found in the area form the collection of the Museo civico archeologico di Sarteano.

Sarteano borders the following municipalities: Cetona, Chianciano Terme, Chiusi, Pienza, Radicofani, and San Casciano dei Bagni.

References

External links
 
 www.comune.sarteano.siena.it/
 Contrada di San Martino - Official website

Cities and towns in Tuscany